Rosyara (Nepali: रोस्यारा) is a western Nepalese Brahmin surname.  Rosyara is rare because it is derived from other common surnames, with only approximately 5,000 people who bear it.  The Gotra of Rosyara is Atraya. Rosyara from Tallo Chhoya and other part of Doti and Dadeldhura are spelled as "Roshyara" (nepali रोश्यारा ).

Rosyara ancestors were royal priests to the kings of Doti, a region in Nepal.

Derivation 

Rosyara was derived from the word "Roshyo," meaning "Kitchen" in Doteli language.

Rosyara served food at rituals and feasts. A cultural belief holds that higher castes must not take food from lower castes. This shows the Rosyara were little trusted or respected by the royal family of Doti.

Rosyara ancestors were royal priests of the King of Doti. Their descendant blood lines are still respected in Nepal.

History 

The Rosyara family lived in a village called Chhoya (in Nepali: छोया) in the 14th century. Their prior history is unknown. Some people believed that the Royal family of Doti Kingdom is connected with Ayoddhya and the sun. That may be the reason they write "Suryabanshi Raja".

The Rosyara family were not the only Royal priests, but it seems that they were closest to the Royal family. Historically, they were royal priests of the powerful Doti Kingdom. The Bhatu Rosyara was an ancestor who had a big house, a horse and a large number of "Jajman" (religious clients). The Chhoya was a gift of King of Doti. The inscription in stone says: Chaitra Badi 7, 1887 (44/221-22).

Royal order to Naran Rosyara:

Doti district was historically a separate country ruled by the Shah family. Rosyara are pandits of the Shah family. This Shah family is different from the current King of Nepal. Doti, independent after 1376. Their domain extended from Kali Kumaon in the west to Karnali in the east, Thakurji in the north and in the south. In 1797 V.S. Mandhata Shah reestablished Doti as an independent state and became its ruler. Deep Shahi ruled Doti when Nepalese troops attacked. His copper plate says up to 1780 AD (Baishakh, 5,1847 VS), which proved that he was not conquered until that date. Amar Singh Thapa defeated the King of Doti in two battles at Dumrakot and Narimghat. Thus Bhadur shah was victorious over the Doteli king, although the Kingdom remained in some ways an administrative unit of the district as a minor ruler (Rajaouta). This shows that Rosyara were already in the place at this time.

Ancestral occupation and cultural traditions

Rosyara ancestors were royal priests ("Pandit" in Nepali). The most famous priests were the priests Tika Dutta and Jaya Raj. The Kuldebata (family goddesses) of the family are Panere and Banthadi. They still pray to these goddess each year. In addition, they pray for Pitarni Jeu (ancestor god) every year. Pitarni Jeu was supposed to protect them from evil in past from Golkoti Balayar rajouta. Pitarni jeu was said to defend against the bad prayers of Golkoti Balayar. Later the Golmakoti balayar had no descendant.

Ancestors and Pedigree 

The following are names of ancestors based on order (first born) 
 Arjun Rosyara (Born around 1709 V.S.)  
 Nana Rosyara  
 Lachhiman Rosyara  
 Narayan Rosyara  
 Shiv Dutt  Rosyara  
 Gopal Rosyara - Hari Krishna Rosyara - Kam Dev Rosyara  
 Tika Dutta Rosyara (1941-2026 B. S.) - Dev Dutta Rosyara  
 Jaya Raj Rosyara - Nil Kantha - Khagendra- Lok Raj - Umakanta

The following are names of ancestors based on  people of chhoya doti (tallo Chhoya).
Purshotam Roshyara
Jay Krishna Roshyara and Padam Nath Roshyara 
Shiva Raj Roshyara and Mahadev Roshyara 
Tika Datta Roshyara and Hem Raj Roshyara

See also 
 Chhoya

References

External links 
 Regmi Research Report 
 Bahadur Shah: Reagent of Nepal- History Book By Bhadra Ratna Bajracharya, Published 1992, Anmol Publications PVT. LTD., Kathmandu, Nepal
 Pedigree of Rosyara Family

Surnames of Nepalese origin
Khas surnames